Sheroma "Brass.Angel" Hodge-Philip (born Sheroma Hodge, 2 February 1985) is a beauty pageant titleholder who was crowned Miss British Virgin Islands 2010, the official representative of the British overseas territory to the 2011 Miss Universe pageant.

Early life
Hodge attended British Virgin Islands High School from 1997 to 2002 and graduated from H. Lavity Stoutt Community College in 2004 with an associate's degree in natural sciences, where she collaborated in public relations and designing the college's website.

Hodge completed a bachelor's degree in media and communication, with a specialization in multimedia, at the University of the West Indies in Mona, Jamaica. She won the multimedia student award for her graduating class.

Miss British Virgin Islands

As the winner of the title, Hodge was crowned by outgoing titleholder Josefina Nunez, gaining the right to represent the British Virgin Islands in the 2011 Miss Universe pageant in São Paulo, Brazil.

References

External links
Official Miss British Virgin Islands website

1985 births
British Virgin Islands beauty pageant winners
Living people
Miss Universe 2011 contestants